The 1999 Spanish motorcycle Grand Prix was the third round of the 1999 Grand Prix motorcycle racing season. It took place on 9 May 1999 at the Circuito Permanente de Jerez. The event is notable for being the last round that 5-time 500cc and reigning World Champion Mick Doohan participated in. Doohan did not start the race due to crashing in the wet qualifying session, resulting in career-ending leg injuries.

500 cc classification

250 cc classification

125 cc classification

Championship standings after the race (500cc)

Below are the standings for the top five riders and constructors after round three has concluded. 

Riders' Championship standings

Constructors' Championship standings

 Note: Only the top five positions are included for both sets of standings.

Notes

References

Spanish motorcycle Grand Prix
Spanish
Motorcycle Grand Prix